Lee Sung-hyun (born January 10, 1991) is a South Korean kickboxer who competes in the lightweight, welterweight and middleweight divisions. He has held World Kickboxing Network welterweight title and RISE Middleweight champion.

Known for his speed and sophisticated combinations, Lee debuted in K-1 in March 2009 and further established himself by winning the RISE Korea Super Lightweight Championship in June 2011. He then went on compete regularly for RISE in Japan and had a breakout year in 2013 by winning the K-1 Korea MAX 2013 Tournament and the RISE lightweight title.

As of April 2013, Lee is ranked the #4 lightweight in the world by LiverKick.com.

Career

Early career
Lee Sung-hyun first came to prominence by winning the KMAA Korean Welterweight Championship and debuted in K-1 on March 20, 2009, beating Kim Tae-hwan by unanimous decision at K-1 Award & MAX Korea 2009 in Seoul, South Korea. In his sophomore appearance in the promotion, he took another unanimous decision over Kizaemon Saiga at the K-1 World MAX 2010 in Seoul World Championship Tournament Final 16 on October 3, 2010. After a slow opening round, Lee began to pull ahead in the second as he dropped Saiga twice in quick succession; firstly with a seven strike combination that culminated in a liver punch and then with a left hook and right low kick combo.

Winning the RISE Lightweight title
He was then recruited by Krush to compete in the tournament to crown the promotion's inaugural 63 kg/138 lb champion. At the Krush First Generation King Tournaments ~Round.2~ in Tokyo, Japan on January 9, 2011, he fought Koya Urabe at the quarter-final stage. The bout was scored a draw after the regulation three rounds and so an extension round was needed to decide a winner, after which Urabe was awarded the unanimous decision. Lee returned to his home country and won a four-man tournament in Seoul on June 17, 2011, beating both Son Jun-hyuk and Park Don-fa by unanimous decision to be crowned the RISE Korea Super Lightweight (-65 kg/143.3 lb) Champion. This further established him as a top prospect in the region and he was soon employed to fight on the main RISE events headquartered in Tokyo. At RISE 85 on November 23, 2011, Lee's momentum was slowed down as he lost in a non-title bout against RISE Super Lightweight Champion Koji Yoshimoto via unanimous decision. Had he not been deducted a point before the start of the fight for missing the contracted weight, he would have gotten a majority draw.

Lee bounced back with an extension round points win over Park Byung-kyu at The Khan 3: New Generation in Seoul on January 15, 2012 before taking on another reigning RISE champion, lightweight titlist Yuki, in a 64 kg/141 lb non-title affair at RISE 88 on June 2, 2012, and winning a majority decision. In the main event of RISE 89 on July 1, 2012, Lee Sung-hyun was able to beat Yuto Watanabe by technical knockout in an extension round. Although he was floored with a spinning back kick in round two, Lee controlled the rest of the bout and earned an extra round in which he dropped Watanabe twice, forcing the referee to call off the bout. He was scheduled to fight Hiroshi Mizumachi at RISE 90 on October 25, 2012, in a #1 contender's bout for a shot at Yuki's lightweight belt, but Mizumachi pulled out two weeks before with an injury and was replaced by Shohei Asahara. Lee bettered Asahara on the judges' scorecards and took a unanimous decision. At the RISE and M-1 Muaythai Challenge co-promoted event ~Infinity I~ on December 2, 2012, he knocked out Buakaw Weerasakreck with a right cross towards the end of the first round in a 63.5 kg/140 lb bout.

With this, he earned a rematch with Yuki and a shot at the RISE Lightweight (-63 kg/138.9 lb) Championship in the main event of the RISE 91/M-1 ~Infinity II~ co-promotion on January 6, 2013. The fight went very much like their first encounter, where Lee used his advantage in speed and combinations to score on Yuki, particularly with low kicks that damaged the more powerful striker and led to a stoppage in round four and captured Lee the title as well as the #4 place in the world lightweight rankings.

K-1 Tournaments
He then moved up to -70 kg/154 lb and returned to K-1 after a two-year absence to compete in the K-1 Korea MAX 2013 eight man tournament in Seoul on February 2, 2013. Drawn against Shingo Garyu in the quarter-finals, he scored a low kick knockdown over his Japanese opponent in round two before completely taking over in three. Lee dropped him again with a right cross after hurting him with a body shot and at times simply teed off on Garyu who was content to block punches with his face. Having won by unanimous decision, he then went up against Zheng Zhao Yu in the semis and won via TKO with a front kick to the body in the second round after forcing a standing eight count earlier. Pongthong Jetsada awaited him in the final, and Lee outpointed the Thai to win a unanimous decision and take the tournament crown. He remained at -70 kg/154 lb for his next outing as he made his Glory debut against Yoshihiro Sato at Glory 8: Tokyo - 2013 65kg Slam on May 3, 2013. Giving up 12 cm/4 inches in height, Lee lost to Sato by unanimous decision in a close match. Lee dropped to 65 kg/143 lb to fight RISE's super lightweight title holder Yasuomi Soda in a non-championship bout at RISE 94 on July 19, 2013. Soda was shown a yellow card after low blowing Lee twice in round one but stormed back to win a majority decision and stop Lee's five-fight winning streak in the promotion. Having qualified for the tournament with his K-1 Korea win, Lee beat Charles François by unanimous decision after scoring a first round knockdown at the K-1 World MAX 2013 World Championship Tournament Final 16 in Majorca, Spain on September 14, 2013.

He took a split decision over Elam Ngor at the K-1 World MAX 2013 World Championship Tournament Quarter Finals - Part 2 in Gran Canaria, Spain on January 11, 2014, in a close, technical affair where Ngor landed a few low blows. At the K-1 World MAX 2013 World Championship Tournament Final 4 in Baku, Azerbaijan on February 23, 2014, he lost to Buakaw Banchamek by UD in the semi-finals. 

He is expected to face Hiroaki Suzuki at -65 kg/143 lb at Shootboxing 2014: Act 3 in Tokyo on June 21, 2014. He won the fight by decision. Lee defended his RISE lightweight title against Shohei Asahara on April 29, 2014, at RISE 99. He won the fight by majority decision. 
Lee was initially set to fight Andrei Kulebin at the K-1 World MAX 2013 World Championship Tournament Final in Pattaya, Thailand on July 26, 2014. The event was postponed due to the 2014 Thai coup d'état, however. He fought Kulebin in October 2014, and won by an extra round decision.

RISE Middleweight champion
Lee participated in the Kunlun Fight Qualification tournament, at KLF 40. He defeated Zhang Chunyu by a third round TKO in the semifinals, and Chris Ngimbi by decision in the finals.

In July 2019, Lee faced Shintaro Matsukura at RISE 133 on July 5, 2019, for the vacant RISE Middleweight Championship. He won the fight by decision.

Lee was scheduled to face Johnny Smith for the WKN World welterweight title at Prokick: Knockdown Lockdown on November 27, 2021. He won the fight by split decision.

Lee faced Tsukuru Midorikawa in a non-title bout at RISE 161 on at RISE 161 on August 28, 2022. The fight was ruled a majority decision draw after the first three rounds, with two judges scoring it as an even 29–29 and 30–30 draw, while the third judge had it scored 30–29 for Midorikawa. The fight was once again ruled a majority draw, after an extra fourth round was contested.

Lee made his first RISE Middleweight title defense against the #1 ranked contender Kaito Ono at RISE ELDORADO 2023 on March 26, 2023.

Championships and awards

Kickboxing
Kunlun Fight
 2016 Kunlun Fight World Max Group F Tournament Winner
K-1
K-1 Korea MAX 2013 Tournament Championship
Korean Martial Arts Association
KMAA Korean Welterweight Championship
RISE
 2011 RISE Korea Super Lightweight (-65 kg/143.3 lb) Champion
 2013 RISE Lightweight (-63 kg/138.9 lb) Champions (one defense)
 2019 RISE Middleweight (-70kg) Champion
World Kickboxing Network
 2021 WKN World Welterweight (-69.8kg/154 lbs) Championship

Kickboxing record

|-  style="text-align:center; background:#"
| 2023-03-26 || ||align=left| Kaito Ono || RISE ELDORADO 2023 || Tokyo, Japan ||  || ||
|-
! style=background:white colspan=9 |
|-
|-  style="background:#c5d2ea;"
| 2022-08-28|| Draw||align=left| Tsukuru Midorikawa || RISE 161 || Tokyo, Japan || Ext.R Decision (Majority)  ||  4 || 3:00 
|-  bgcolor="#CCFFCC"
| 2021-11-27|| Win ||align=left| Johnny Smith || Prokick: Knockdown Lockdown || Belfast, Northern Ireland || Decision (Split) || 5 || 3:00
|-
! style=background:white colspan=9 |
|-  bgcolor="#FFBBBB"
| 2019-09-28 || Loss ||align=left| Kaito || Shoot Boxing 2019 act.4 || Tokyo, Japan || Decision (Unanimous) || 5 || 3:00
|-  bgcolor="#CCFFCC"
| 2019-07-05|| Win ||align=left| Shintaro Matsukura || RISE 133 || Japan || Decision (Unanimous)|| 5 || 3:00
|-
! style=background:white colspan=9 |
|-  bgcolor="#CCFFCC"
| 2018-06-17|| Win ||align=left| Shintaro Matsukura || RISE 125 || Chiba, Japan || Ext.R Decision (Unanimous) || 4 || 3:00
|-  bgcolor="#CCFFCC"
| 2018-05-12|| Win ||align=left| Vladimir Shuliak || KTK in Kimpo || South Korea || Decision || 3 || 3:00
|-  bgcolor="#CCFFCC"
| 2017-05-14|| Win ||align=left| Sundui Batjargal || ICX Seoul || South Korea || KO (Right Low Kick)|| 2 || 
|-  bgcolor="#FFBBBB"
| 2016-08-20 || Loss ||align=left| Jomthong Chuwattana || Kunlun Fight 50 – World MAX 2016 Final 16 || Jinan, China || Decision (unanimous) || 3 || 3:00
|-  bgcolor="#CCFFCC"
| 2016-03-25 || Win ||align=left| Chris Ngimbi || Kunlun Fight 40 – World MAX 2016 Group F Tournament Final || Tongling, China || Decision (unanimous) || 3 ||3:00 
|-
! style=background:white colspan=9 |
|-
|-  bgcolor="#CCFFCC"
| 2016-03-25 || Win ||align=left| Zhang Chunyu || Kunlun Fight 40 – World MAX 2016 Group F Tournament Semi Finals || Tongling, China || TKO || 3 || 
|-
|-  bgcolor="#CCFFCC"
| 2016-01-23 || Win ||align=left| Jiao Daobo || Kunlun Fight 37 || China || Decision (unanimous) || 3 || 3:00
|-  bgcolor="#CCFFCC"
| 2016-01-09 || Win ||align=left| Gu Hui || Kunlun Fight 36 || Shanghai, China || Decision (unanimous)|| 3 || 3:00
|-  bgcolor="#CCFFCC"
| 2015-11-14 || Win ||align=left| Mohan Dragon || MKF Ultimate Victor 2015 || Incheon, South Korea || Decision (unanimous) || 3 || 3:00
|-  bgcolor="#CCFFCC"
| 2014-10-11 || Win ||align=left| Andrei Kulebin || K-1 World MAX 2014 World Championship Tournament Final || Pattaya, Thailand || Ext.R decision || 4 || 3:00
|-  bgcolor="#CCFFCC"
| 2014-06-21 || Win ||align=left| Hiroaki Suzuki || Shootboxing 2014: Act 3 || Tokyo, Japan || Decision (unanimous) || 5 || 3:00
|-  bgcolor="#CCFFCC"
| 2014-04-29 || Win || align=left| Shohei Asahara || RISE 99 || Tokyo, Japan || Decision (majority)|| 5 || 3:00
|-
! style=background:white colspan=9 |
|-  bgcolor="#CCFFCC"
| 2014-03-31 || Win || align=left| Meng Guodong || Kunlun Fight 3 || Harbin, China || KO || 2 || 2:00
|-  bgcolor="#FFBBBB"
| 2014-02-23 || Loss || align=left| Buakaw Banchamek || K-1 World MAX 2013 Tournament Final 4, Semi Finals || Baku, Azerbaijan || Decision (unanimous) || 3 || 3:00
|-  bgcolor="#CCFFCC"
| 2014-01-11 || Win ||align=left| Elam Ngor || K-1 World MAX 2013 Tournament Quarter Finals - Part 2, Quarter Finals || Gran Canaria, Spain || Decision (split) || 3 || 3:00
|-  bgcolor="#CCFFCC"
| 2013-09-14 || Win ||align=left| Charles François || K-1 World MAX 2013 Tournament Final 16, First Round || Majorca, Spain || Decision (unanimous) || 3 || 3:00
|-  bgcolor="#FFBBBB"
| 2013-07-19 || Loss ||align=left| Yasuomi Soda || RISE 94 || Tokyo, Japan || Decision (majority) || 3 || 3:00
|-  bgcolor="#FFBBBB"
| 2013-05-03 || Loss ||align=left| Yoshihiro Sato || Glory 8: Tokyo || Tokyo, Japan || Decision (unanimous) || 3 || 3:00
|-  bgcolor="#CCFFCC"
| 2013-02-02 || Win ||align=left| Pongthong Jetsada || K-1 Korea MAX 2013, Final || Seoul, South Korea || Decision (unanimous) || 3 || 3:00
|-
! style=background:white colspan=9 |
|-  bgcolor="#CCFFCC"
| 2013-02-02 || Win ||align=left| Zheng Zhaoyu || K-1 Korea MAX 2013, Semi Finals || Seoul, South Korea || TKO (front kick to the body) || 2 || 2:04
|-  bgcolor="#CCFFCC"
| 2013-02-02 || Win ||align=left| Shingo Garyu || K-1 Korea MAX 2013, Quarter Finals || Seoul, South Korea || Decision (unanimous) || 3 || 3:00
|-  bgcolor="#CCFFCC"
| 2013-01-06 || Win ||align=left| Yuki || RISE 91/M-1 ~Infinity II~ || Tokyo, Japan || KO (low kicks) || 4 || 1:58
|-
! style=background:white colspan=9 |
|-  bgcolor="#CCFFCC"
| 2012-12-02 || Win ||align=left| Buakaw Weerasakreck || RISE/M-1 ~Infinity I~ || Tokyo, Japan || KO (right cross) || 1 || 2:58
|-  bgcolor="#CCFFCC"
| 2012-10-25 || Win ||align=left| Shohei Asahara || RISE 90 || Tokyo, Japan || Decision (unanimous) || 3 || 3:00
|-  bgcolor="#CCFFCC"
| 2012-07-01 || Win ||align=left| Yuto Watanabe || RISE 89 || Tokyo, Japan || TKO (right cross) || 4 || 1:29
|-  bgcolor="#CCFFCC"
| 2012-06-02 || Win ||align=left| Yuki || RISE 88 || Tokyo, Japan || Decision (majority) || 3 || 3:00
|-  bgcolor="#CCFFCC"
| 2012-01-15 || Win ||align=left| Park Byung-kyu || The Khan 3: New Generation || Seoul, South Korea || Ext.R decision (unanimous) || 4 || 3:00
|-  bgcolor="#FFBBBB"
| 2011-11-23 || Loss ||align=left| Koji Yoshimoto || RISE 85 || Tokyo, Japan || Decision (unanimous) || 3 || 3:00
|-  bgcolor="#CCFFCC"
| 2011-06-17 || Win ||align=left| Park Don-fa || RISE Korea, Final || Seoul, South Korea || Decision (unanimous) || 3 || 3:00
|-
! style=background:white colspan=9 |
|-  bgcolor="#CCFFCC"
| 2011-06-17 || Win ||align=left| Son Jun-hyuk || RISE Korea, Semi Finals || Seoul, South Korea || KO (low kicks) || 2 || 1:50
|-  bgcolor="#FFBBBB"
| 2011-01-09 || Loss ||align=left| Koya Urabe || Krush First Generation King Tournaments ~Round.2~, Quarter Finals || Tokyo, Japan || Ext.R decision (unanimous) || 4 || 3:00
|-  bgcolor="#CCFFCC"
| 2010-10-03 || Win ||align=left| Kizaemon Saiga || K-1 World MAX 2010 in Seoul World Championship Tournament Final 16 || Seoul, South Korea || Decision (unanimous) || 3 || 3:00
|-  bgcolor="#CCFFCC"
| 2010-00-00 || Win ||align=left| Kwon Min-seok || RISE Korea || Seoul, South Korea || Decision || 3 || 3:00
|-  bgcolor="#CCFFCC"
| 2009-03-20 || Win ||align=left| Kim Tae-hwan|| K-1 Award & MAX Korea 2009 || Seoul, South Korea || Decision (unanimous) || 3 || 3:00
|-
| colspan=9 | Legend:

External links
 Official Glory profile

References

Living people
1991 births
South Korean male kickboxers
Lightweight kickboxers
Welterweight kickboxers
Middleweight kickboxers
Sportspeople from Incheon
Kunlun Fight kickboxers